The Socialist Youth Union (SSM) was a youth organization in Bulgaria, founded in 1921. SSM was the youth wing of the Bulgarian Social Democratic Workers Party.

References

Youth wings of political parties in Bulgaria
Youth wings of social democratic parties

Youth organizations established in 1921